Esthlodora is a genus of moths of the family Noctuidae.

Species
 Esthlodora cyanospila Turner, 1908
 Esthlodora variabilis Swinhoe, 1901
 Esthlodora versicolor Turner, 1902

References
 Esthlodora  at Markku Savela's Lepidoptera and Some Other Life Forms
 Natural History Museum Lepidoptera genus database

Hypeninae
Moth genera